The 1959 Harvard Crimson football team was an American football team that represented Harvard University during the 1958 NCAA University Division football season. Harvard tied for third place in the Ivy League.

In their third year under head coach John Yovicsin, the Crimson compiled a 6–3 record and outscored opponents 177 to 101. Harold J. Keohane was the team captain.

Harvard's 4–3 conference record placed tied for third-best in the Ivy League. The Crimson outscored Ivy opponents 121 to 73. 

Harvard played its home games at Harvard Stadium in the Allston neighborhood of Boston, Massachusetts.

Schedule

References

Harvard
Harvard Crimson football seasons
Harvard Crimson football
1950s in Boston